Iris was a 20-gun corvette of the French Navy. The Royal Navy captured her in 1809 and took her into service as HMS Rainbow. She was sold in 1815.

French service and capture
Iris was built to plan by Louis Bretocq, a plan that Jacques-Noël Sané altered. However, Bretocq probably acted as cosntructeur. Construction did not begin until some two years after the order, and Iris was then on the stocks for some three years.

The French Navy commissioned Iris on 31 December 1808, under capitaine de fregate Charles Méquet (or Joseph-Jean Macquet, or Miquet). She left Dunkirk 29 January 1809 with 640 casks of flour for Martinique. En route, on 2 February at 11am she encountered HMS Aimable, under Captain Lord George Stuart, while off the Texel on the Wellbank. A 28-hour chase ensued, followed by a short running fight 38 leagues off Aberdeen. In the action Iris lost two men killed and eight wounded, and Aimable lost one man killed and one wounded. Iris then struck. Iris was brought into Yarmouth roads in early February. Lloyd's List reported that she had been captured on 4 February, and that at the time of the encounter she had been in company with a brig.

Royal Navy service
Iris arrived at Woolwich on 14 March 1809. There the Royal Navy took her into service as HMS Rainbow and proceeded to fit her out until 23 August. The British upgraded her armament, turning her into a 28-gun sixth rate. Commander James Woolridge commissioned her in August. He then sailed her for Jamaica on 24 November.

On 13 March 1810, Rainbow encountered the French frigate Néréide, under the command of Jean-François Lemaresquier, off Point Abaco. Though Néréide was almost twice the size of Rainbow, Lemaresquier was uninterested in getting into an engagement. Next morning though, under Commander Henry Fraser, joined the chase. Lemaresqueir continued to flee to separate the two British ships, but stopped to engage Rainbow after Avon had fallen back. He soon had reduced Rainbow to a battered state, but Avon resolutely came in support and put a 30-minute fight against the much stronger Néréide before herself retreating. Rainbow suffered ten men wounded; Avon had one man killed, one mortally wounded, and seven wounded. The French account is that damage on Néréide prevented her from giving chase. Lemaresquier therefore continued on his course, reaching Brest on 30 March. The British account is that Néréide declined to continue the action, despite the damaged state of the two British ships, and instead sailed on. The two British ships then made for Jamaica as best they could, arriving on the 16th.

Rainbow returned to Britain, before sailing for the Mediterranean on 12 May 1811. Captain Gardiner Henry Guion assumed command on 26 September 1811. He sailed Rainbow in support of the Catalan patriots, against the French. In 1812 Captain Andrew King took command.

Captain Gawen Hamilton took command in 1813. On 8 April 1813 he was already in command when Rainbow captured the French brig Paix. On 1 July Rainbow, in company with the lugger Thistle, recaptured Perseverance.

During the night they found her and were able to come up on either side of her. They then forced her on shore under Cape Cavallo, Sardinia (probably Capo Coda Cavallo).

On 11 September, Rainbows boats captured two latines off the Bay of Ajaccio. One had on board a lieutenant and several men of the 2d Battalion of French pioneers. The other was carrying a cargo of wheat.

Next, on 13 December, Hamilton went onshore to assist the Italian levies in their unsuccessful attack on Leghorn. He joined a force of marines from a squadron of eight British warships, including Rainbow. During this operation Hamilton was lightly wounded.

In April 1814 Rainbow supported the British Army in its successful attack on Genoa, losing one man severely wounded. The British drove off the French defenders, who left behind two 24-pounder guns and two mortars. The British lost two men killed and five wounded. Prize money for Genoa was paid in 1818. Next, Rainbow was part of the naval force in the British capture of Savona on 24 April.

Captain Edward Silby replaced Hamilton in 1814, only to be replaced by Captain James Black, who in turn was replaced by James Wemyss in July.

Fate
Rainbow was paid off in December 1814. The Navy offered her for sale at Deptford on 23 March 1815. It sold her on 25 March for £860.

Notes, citations, and references
Notes

Citations

References

External links
 

Age of Sail corvettes of France
1806 ships
Ships built in France
Captured ships
Sixth rates of the Royal Navy